Amir Azrafshan (born 17 August 1987) is a Swedish football manager who is currently managing Dalkurd FF.

Early life
Azrafshan emigrated to Falun at the age of 10.

Managerial career

Östersund
Azrafshan was appointed as manager of Swedish Allsvenskan side Östersund on 11 July 2020 during the 2020 Allsvenskan season after Englishman Ian Burchnall.

Dalkurd
Azrafshan was appointed as manager of Superettan side Dalkurd FF in June 2022 during the 2022 Superettan season.

References

Swedish football managers
Sportspeople of Iranian descent
People from Falun
Iranian emigrants to Sweden
Iranian expatriate football managers
Östersunds FK managers
Dalkurd FF managers
1987 births
Living people